The Peierls substitution method, named after the original work by Rudolf Peierls is a widely employed approximation for describing tightly-bound electrons in the presence of a slowly varying magnetic vector potential.

In the presence of an external magnetic vector potential , the translation operators, which form the kinetic part of the Hamiltonian in the tight-binding framework, are simply
 
and in the second quantization formulation 

The phases are defined as

Properties
 The flux quanta per plaquette  is related to the accumulated phase of a single particle state,  surrounding a plaquette:

Justification
Here we give three derivations of the Peierls substitution, each one is based on a different formulation of quantum mechanics theory.

Axiomatic approach
Here we give a simple derivation of the Peierls substitution, which is based on The Feynman Lectures (Vol. III, Chapter 21). This derivation postulates that magnetic fields are incorporated in the tight-binding model by adding a phase to the hopping terms and show that it is consistent with the continuum Hamiltonian. Thus, our starting point is the Hofstadter Hamiltonian:

The translation operator  can be written explicitly using its generator, that is the momentum operator. Under this representation its easy to expand it up to the second order,

and in a 2D lattice . Next, we expand up to the second order the phase factors, assuming that the vector potential does not vary significantly over one lattice spacing (which is taken to be small)

Substituting these expansions to relevant part of the Hamiltonian yields 

Generalizing the last result to the 2D case, the we arrive to Hofstadter Hamiltonian at the continuum limit: 

Semi-classical approach
Here we show that the Peierls phase factor originates from the propagator of an electron in a magnetic field due to the dynamical term  appearing in the Lagrangian. In the path integral formalism, which generalizes the action principle of classical mechanics, the transition amplitude from site  at time  to site  at time  is given by

The Lagrangian of the system can be written as

where  is the Lagrangian in the absence of a magnetic field. The corresponding action reads

Now, assuming that only one path contributes strongly, we have

Hence, the transition amplitude of an electron subject to a magnetic field is the one in the absence of a magnetic field times a phase.

Another derivation
The Hamiltonian is given by 
 
where  is the potential landscape due to the crystal lattice. The Bloch theorem asserts that the solution to the problem:, is to be sought in the Bloch sum form

The corresponding eigenvalues , which form bands depending on the crystal momentum , are obtained by calculating the matrix element

and ultimately depend on material-dependent hopping integrals 

In the presence of the magnetic field the Hamiltonian changes to

where  is the charge of the particle. To amend this, consider changing the Wannier functions to

where . This makes the new Bloch wave functions

into eigenstates of the full Hamiltonian at time , with the same energy as before. To see this we first use  to write

Then when we compute the hopping integral in quasi-equilibrium (assuming that the vector potential changes slowly)

where we have defined , the flux through the triangle made by the three position arguments. Since we assume  is approximately uniform at the lattice scale - the scale at which the Wannier states are localized to the positions  - we can approximate , yielding the desired result,

Therefore, the matrix elements are the same as in the case without magnetic field, apart from the phase factor picked up, which is denoted the Peierls phase factor. This is tremendously convenient, since then we get to use the same material parameters regardless of the magnetic field value, and the corresponding phase is computationally trivial to take into account. For electrons it amounts to replacing the hopping term  with

References

Electronic structure methods
Electronic band structures